San Miguel Achiutla is a town and municipality in Oaxaca in south-western Mexico. The municipality covers an area of 59.97 km². 
It is part of the Tlaxiaco District in the south of the Mixteca Region.

As of 2005, the municipality had a total population of 799.

References

External links
Santos in Oaxaca's Ancient Churches: San Miguel Achiutla - Art-historical study of the statues in the church

Enciclopedia de los municipios de México (Spanish - click on "Municipios" in the menu on the left, then page down to "San Miguel Achiutla.")

Municipalities of Oaxaca